The 2017 LPGA of Korea Tour is the 40th season of the LPGA of Korea Tour, the professional golf tour for women operated by the Korea Ladies Professional Golf' Association. It consists of 33 golf tournaments, 29 played in South Korea, three in China, and one in Japan. Hanwha Finance Classic became one of the tour's major tournaments starting from this season, which makes the tour have 5 major tournaments.

Schedule
The number in parentheses after winners' names show the player's total number wins in official money individual events on the LPGA of Korea Tour, including that event.

Events in bold are majors.

External links
 

LPGA of Korea Tour
LPGA of Korea Tour